Be Ever Wonderful is the third Japanese studio album by S.E.S. It was released on May 24, 2000 under VAP.

Singles
"Love" was the first single from the album and the group's sixth full Japanese single. It was released on April 21, 2000, and sold approximately 5,000 copies.

Track listing

 Love~ (4:12)
 Round & Round (4:15)
 Round & Round (Again And Again Mix) (4:15)
 Love~ (Instrumental) (4:12)

"The Aurora" was the second single from the album, and the group's overall "6.5" Japanese single. It was released July 21, 2000, and sold approximately 3,000 copies.

Track listing

 海のオーロラ (Single Version)
 海のオーロラ (Northern Lights Mix)
 海のオーロラ (Blizzard Mix)
 海のオーロラ (Instrumental)

Album track listing
 Brand New ★ World (3:52)
 Do & Be (4:02)
 A Song For You (4:31)
 W/O/U (4:43)
 Love~いつまでもオンジェ・カジナ~ (4:12)
 To: My Sweety Lover (3:48)
 海のオーロラ (5:14)
 Life -this is the power- (3:49)
 Miracle (4:01)
 Round & Round (4:09)
 Love~いつまでもオンジェ・カジナ~(GRASS ROOTS MIX) (4:07)

External links 
  S.E.S.' Official Site
  SM Entertainment's Official Site

2000 albums
S.E.S. (group) albums